Scritti Politti are a British band, originally formed in 1977 in Leeds, England, by Welsh singer-songwriter Green Gartside. He is the only member of the band to have remained throughout the group's history.

Beginning as a punk-inspired collective of art students and squatters, Scritti Politti released several early post-punk recordings on Rough Trade Records before transitioning into a mainstream pop music project in the early to mid- 1980s, enjoying significant success in the record charts in the UK and the US. The group's most successful album, 1985's Cupid & Psyche 85, spawned three UK Top 20 hits with "Wood Beez (Pray Like Aretha Franklin)", "Absolute", and "The Word Girl", as well as a US Top 20 hit with "Perfect Way".

The band's 1988 album Provision was a UK Top 10 success, though it only produced one UK Top 20 hit single, "Oh Patti". After releasing two non-album singles in 1991, as well as a collaboration with B.E.F., Gartside became disillusioned with the music industry and retired to south Wales for more than seven years. He returned in the late 1990s, releasing a new album, Anomie & Bonhomie, in 1999 (which included various rock and hip hop influences). In 2005 Rough Trade released the compilation Early, which collected the band's first releases. In 2006 Gartside released the stripped-down White Bread, Black Beer.

History

Origins
In the mid-1970s, Green Gartside was studying fine art at Leeds Polytechnic (now Leeds Beckett University). The punk rock group Sex Pistols 'Anarchy' tour, which included The Damned and The Heartbreakers, was launched at the Polytechnic on 6 December 1976. It inspired Gartside to form a band with his childhood friend Nial Jinks and fellow student Tom Morley.

Scritti Politti originally consisted of Gartside as the lead vocalist, Jinks as bass player, and Morley as drummer, with Matthew Kay as their manager who sometimes played the keyboard. Gartside and Jinks had been at Croesyceiliog Grammar School together in Cwmbran, South Wales, and Gartside met Morley at Leeds Polytechnic. For their first public performance in 1976, supporting local Leeds punk group SOS, the group went under the name 'The Against'.

Upon finishing their studies, the group relocated to London's Camden Town around 1977, where they lived in a squat. The name Scritti Politti was chosen as a homage to the Italian Marxist writer and political theorist Antonio Gramsci. The correct spelling in Italian to refer to "Political Writings" would have produced Scritti Politici. Gartside changed it to Scritti Politti as he thought it sounded more rock and roll, like the Little Richard song "Tutti Frutti". Alongside other groups of what has been termed the DIY ethic or movement (notably the Desperate Bicycles and Steve Treatment, the latter being associated with the Swell Maps), Scritti Politti released a DIY record titled "Skank Bloc Bologna" (a sort of ode to the traditionally leftist Italian city of Bologna), on their own St. Pancras label in 1978. To the raw energy of punk, Scritti Politti added a creative spontaneity and a mock-philosophical intelligence in their lyrics, with allusions to intellectual figures such as Karl Marx, Mikhail Bakunin, Jacques Derrida, Gilles Deleuze, and Jacques Lacan.

"Skank Bloc Bologna" picked up airplay on John Peel's BBC Radio 1 show, and the band were signed to Rough Trade under Geoff Travis in 1979, making them labelmates with the other Cardiff avant-garde band, Young Marble Giants. Scritti Politti released two EPs in 1979 with singles "Bibbly-O-Tek", "Doubt Beat", "OPEC/Immac" and "Hegemony". "Hegemony"—which Gartside eventually cited as being based on the old English folk song "Lemady"—led to more melodic songs such as "Confidence", which in turn hinted at the direction the band would take in the 1980s.

Gartside reduced the band to three pieces. It exhibited an explicit do-it-yourself attitude, which manifested itself in their hand-made record sleeves with detailed breakdowns of production costs, including addresses and phone numbers of record pressing plants, and their own Camden squat address for feedback. They even produced a booklet called "How To Make A Record", which was given the catalogue number SCRIT 3, and aimed to be a comprehensive guide to recording and releasing a record for aspiring indie artists, based on Scritti Politti's personal experience of putting out their first three singles independently, plus extra research they'd done on the subject. By the time of the 4 A-Sides EP in 1979, the group had developed a sound described by AllMusic as "scrappy, taut, and forthrightly experimental in style, utilizing abrupt changes, rhythmic displacements, and gritty and discordant harmonies tempered by Gartside's sweet vocalizing of impenetrably obscure lyrics, vaguely political in sense but temporal and abstract in meaning."

1980s
Scritti Politti began planning their debut album in 1979, but the recording had to be delayed when Green collapsed after a gig supporting Gang of Four in Brighton in early 1980. Originally believed to be a heart attack, the cause of his collapse was eventually diagnosed as a panic attack, brought on by his chronic stage fright and his unhealthy lifestyle. Returning home to south Wales at his parents' insistence for a nine-month convalescence period, Green had plenty of time to think about the direction the band and their music were going in. During 1979 he had already become less interested in the independent music and punk scene and had started listening to and buying American funk and disco like Chic and the Jacksons, American soul like Aretha Franklin, and 1960s British beat music such as the Beatles' early records. Green came to the conclusion that "you don't have to be lobotomised in order to make pop music. It's a real passion to make it" and that making pop music didn't mean selling out punk's principles or dumbing down: "I think the politics of punk does survive. There are a whole lot [of] people who aren't happy to make pap but want to make pop. They understand that what sells means something. It finds a way into people's hearts in a way that independent music never did." He explained his reasons for abandoning the band's original "do-it-yourself" philosophy to Smash Hits in November 1981:

As well as his musical change of heart, Green had also abandoned the strict Marxist philosophy of the early Scritti Politti ideas and recordings, saying that "a lot of the very oppositional politics that we'd been involved in lost their appeal and credibility for me. I rejected the principles of that, what was monolithical Marxism. I no longer supported the mechanism which held that up, and carried over to the music. Plus I was bored shitless with the noise we were making."

Before his collapse Green had already broached the concept of taking the group in a more commercial pop direction with his bandmates. His ideas did not go down well with them, as he recounted in an interview for Jamming! fanzine in June 1982:

Gartside recorded a demo of one of his new songs, "The 'Sweetest Girl'", in January 1981, and the song was included on the C81 cassette compilation obtained with tokens from the March issues of NME. The song — which features Robert Wyatt on keyboards — received strong reviews. It was cited by The New York Times as one of the ten best singles of the year, but the track did not get a wide release for ten months, by which time momentum was lost, and it only achieved a minor placing in the UK Singles Chart at No. 64. The single was later covered by pop band Madness, with their version reaching No. 35 in the UK singles chart in 1986. Drummer Tom Morley departed Scritti Politti in November 1981.

"The 'Sweetest Girl'" prompted many major labels to offer Gartside record contracts, but he decided to stay with Rough Trade Records. The 'Sweetest Girl''' marked a stylistic change toward the more melodic, and was followed by minor hits "Faithless" (UK No. 56) and double A-side "Asylums in Jerusalem" / "Jacques Derrida" (UK No. 43). In a retrospective review, "Asylums in Jerusalem" was described by AllMusic journalist Stewart Mason as "a slick piece of reggae-tinged synth-pop with a twangy electronic bass line and a new playfulness in Green Gartside's politically motivated lyrics." The song "Jacques Derrida" was influenced by Gartside's reading of deconstruction and the work of semiotic analysis from the French philosopher Derrida.

The debut album, Songs to Remember, was released on Rough Trade in August 1982. Displaying Gartside's previously hidden reggae influence, it was a critical and commercial success, reaching No. 12 in the UK Albums Chart. One of Rough Trade's most unlikely success stories, the album became their biggest selling release to date. Also during this period, Gartside recorded a duet with Annie Lennox on the Eurythmics track "Wrap It Up", for their Sweet Dreams (Are Made of This) album released in early 1983.

Around this time Gartside returned to his home in South Wales:
I became sick. I went back to Caerleon... and I started listening to my sister's music for the first time. She had a lot of black music. Around that time my parents moved to Florida, and it was visiting there I first heard black radio – that's where I first heard 'the funk'. The System, Zapp... artists like that. There was a rapid change of influences combined with a disgust at big-I 'Indie' being born. It didn't take long to say, 'Fuck that, let's do this instead.'"

Gartside became influenced by the new sounds coming out of New York City, especially hip hop. He signed with Virgin Records in 1983 (and with Warner Bros. in the US.) The original line-up was disbanded and Gartside moved to New York.

Collaborating with veteran producer Arif Mardin, David Gamson and Fred Maher, the first recording to emerge from these sessions was the single: "Wood Beez (Pray Like Aretha Franklin)". Released in February 1984, "Wood Beez" was an immediate UK hit, peaking at No. 10, and was also successful in Australia, charting at No. 25, and in New Zealand where it reached No. 26. A series of intricately programmed dance/soul-style hits followed, including "Absolute" (UK No. 17), "Hypnotize" (UK No. 68 and No. 43 on the US Dance Charts) and the reggae-styled "The Word Girl", which became Scritti Politti's biggest UK hit single, climbing to No. 6 in May 1985.

In June 1985, Scritti Politti released their second (and most successful) album, Cupid & Psyche 85, with songs produced by Arif Mardin and performances by numerous session musicians. The LP was a Top 5 hit in the UK and also sold well in the US. In addition to the four already released singles, the album included the song, "Perfect Way". It was only a minor hit when released in the UK (No. 48) but it became the band's biggest US single, peaking at No. 11.

The personnel for Cupid and Psyche 85  differed from that of their first album, and featured keyboardist David Gamson and ex-Material drummer Fred Maher, both of whom would collaborate with Gartside on songwriting and production duties. Arif Mardin would also produce three songs for the album. Stylistically, the songs on the album feature dense timbral counterpoint (in fact, nearly every song on the album), using synthesizer chords and effects (as well as "real" instruments), programmed largely by David Gamson, creating a style that they would refine in their next album. In the US, "Wood Beez" was re-released as the follow-up single to "Perfect Way", but it only managed to hit No. 91 (it had previously hit No. 4 on the US Dance Charts in late 1984).

In 1986, Gartside and Gamson wrote and produced "Love of a Lifetime" for Chaka Khan, which appeared on her Destiny album. The same year they also collaborated to write the title track for Al Jarreau's album, L is For Lover.

In 1987, Scritti Politti appeared on the Who's That Girl soundtrack with the song "Best Thing Ever". This track also appeared on the next Scritti Politti album, 1988's Provision, which continued Gartside's development into synth-funk as well as reggae and other styles. The roster of session players became even more notable, including contributions from Roger Troutman, Marcus Miller and Miles Davis, who performed on the single "Oh Patti (Don't Feel Sorry For Loverboy)", a UK No. 13 hit. However, although the album charted in the Top 10 in the UK (No. 8), it did not match the commercial success of Cupid and Psyche 85 in the US, stalling at No. 113.

1990s
Scritti Politti hit the UK charts again in 1991 with their cover of The Beatles' song, "She's a Woman", which featured guest vocals from Shabba Ranks and a remix version by William Orbit. It became Scritti Politti's final UK Top 20 single, peaking at No. 20. This was swiftly followed by the release of "Take Me in Your Arms And Love Me"', a cover of the Gladys Knight song, featuring guest vocals from Sweetie Irie, which failed to chart inside the Top 40. The same year, Gartside also worked with B.E.F. as a guest vocalist for their cover of "I Don't Know Why I Love You" for the album Music of Quality and Distinction, Volume 2. However, a new Scritti Politti album never materialised, with Gartside deciding on another hiatus.

The hip-hop inspired album Anomie and Bonhomie was released in 1999, and involved even more session artists. The now bearded Gartside dived directly into the now commercially accessible hip hop scene, borrowing tradesmen of the genre such as Mos Def and Jimahl amongst others. While considered by many critics to be a return to form, the album was not as commercially successful as their previous output, reaching only No. 33 on the UK Albums Chart.

21st century

In 2003, Gartside appeared on Kylie Minogue's album Body Language, duetting on the Emiliana Torrini co-write "Someday".

In February 2005, Rough Trade released Early, a compilation album of Scritti Politti's earliest recordings.

In early January 2006, Gartside and a new incarnation of Scritti Politti, billed as 'Double G and The Traitorous 3', played a show in Brixton. This was Gartside's first live appearance since 1980. This band, including journalist/musician Rhodri Marsden on keyboards, Dicky Moore on guitar and Ralph Phillips on drums, played a number of concerts previewing a new album, White Bread, Black Beer, which was released on Rough Trade on 29 May 2006. Later that year, White Bread, Black Beer was nominated for the Mercury Music Prize.

The current line-up toured worldwide (under the Scritti Politti name) on the back of the album's success, embarked on their first-ever North American tour in October 2006 and completed a UK tour in November 2006. They appeared at the Bestival music festival in September 2006, and at Summer Sonic Festival in Japan. On 19 December, they played a short set at the Rough Trade Christmas party in London.

In 2007, Gartside worked on an album with Alexis Taylor, the singer with Hot Chip. The pair met at the Mercury Music Prize ceremony, and played a concert supporting Kieran Hebden and Steve Reid at KOKO in London in March 2007.

Gartside joined 'Way to Blue: The Songs of Nick Drake', a 2008 UK and Australian tour featuring interpretations of Nick Drake's songs by amongst others, Robyn Hitchcock, Lisa Hannigan and Teddy Thompson. A subsequent live 15-track CD was released, including Gartside's version of Drake's "Fruit Tree" which he also performed at The Barbican, London.

In 2009, Gartside participated in 'Very Cellular Songs', a concert at The Barbican celebrating the music of The Incredible String Band, featuring Richard Thompson, Kamila Thompson, Alasdair Roberts, and Dr. Strangely Strange.

On 28 February 2011, Absolute, a compilation of singles and album tracks was released, with two new tracks both written with David Gamson: "Day Late and a Dollar Short" and "A Place We Both Belong". Gamson played a part in the recording of both Cupid & Psyche 85 and Provision. The album was voted "Best New Reissue" by Pitchfork on 10 March 2011.

The Tracey Thorn Christmas album Tinsel and Lights, released in October 2012, featured a duet with Gartside and a cover of the song "Snow in Sun" from White Bread, Black Beer.

Gartside has also collaborated with fellow Welshmen, the Manic Street Preachers. In addition to Gartside contributing lead vocals to the track "Between the Clock and the Bed" on the Manics' Futurology album (2014), Scritti Politti was the support act for three of the Manics' live shows in April 2014.

In 2020, Gartside released a solo single under his own name. This release on Rough Trade records featured covers of "Tangled Man" and "Wishing Well" as originally recorded by folk singer Anne Briggs.

Rough Trade also picked up the rights to the band's Virgin/Warner US albums with Cupid & Psyche 85, Provision and Anomie & Bonhomie due to be re-issued on CD and vinyl by the indie label on 30 July 2021, with a re-issue of Provision delayed until later in the year.

Legacy
Miles Davis covered Scritti Politti's song "Perfect Way" on his 1986 album Tutu. Davis also appeared on the track "Oh Patti (Don't Feel Sorry For Loverboy)" on the band's album Provision.

"The Sweetest Girl" was covered by Madness on their 1985 album, Mad Not Mad.

There are references to Scritti Politti's "sugar coated pop" sound on Max Tundra's Parallax Error Beheads You. Tundra said that he welcomed comparisons with Scritti Politti.

Kurt Feldman (The Pains of Being Pure at Heart, The Depreciation Guild) stated that the band's music is a major inspiration for his work. The influence is especially prominent on the album Afar, released under his Ice Choir project.

DiscographySongs to Remember (1982)Cupid & Psyche 85 (1985)Provision (1988)Anomie & Bonhomie (1999)White Bread Black Beer'' (2006)

See also
List of post-punk bands
List of new wave artists and bands
List of 1980s one-hit wonders in the United States
List of performers on Top of the Pops
List of Peel sessions

References

Notes

External links

Official website
 Green Gartside/Scritti Politti biography at Allmusic
Scritti Politti biography from BBC Wales
bibbly-o-tek
The Scritti Politti Workshop: articles, pictures, discography, lyrics.
New Yorker article on Scritti Politti
Gartside interviewed by Simon Reynolds
Gartside interviewed by Jochen Bonz

Art pop musicians
British soul musical groups
English new wave musical groups
Post-punk groups from Leeds
British synth-pop new wave groups
Musical groups established in 1977
Rough Trade Records artists
Sophisti-pop musical groups
Music and politics
Avant-pop musicians
English synth-pop groups